Asel K. Roberts (born 1976) is a Kazakh-born American diplomat who served as Acting Chief of Protocol of the United States from January 20, 2021 to January 3, 2022.

Early life
Roberts was born in Almaty, Kazakhstan in 1976. She graduated from Georgetown University's Walsh School of Foreign Service with a Bachelor of Science degree in International Law and Organizations. In addition to English, she also speaks Russian, Kazakh, and Japanese.

Chief of Protocol
Roberts had more than 15 years of experience in the Office of the Chief of Protocol and was serving as a senior advisor when she became the acting chief of protocol in Joe Biden's administration.

References

1976 births
People from Almaty
Kazakhstani emigrants to the United States
Chiefs of Protocol of the United States
Biden administration personnel
Living people
Georgetown University alumni
Date of birth missing (living people)